Eternity Weeps is an original novel written by Jim Mortimore and based on the long-running British science fiction television series Doctor Who. It features the Seventh Doctor, Chris, Bernice, Jason and Liz.
 
The book was the first New Adventure to feature a new logo, de-emphasising Doctor Who. The Doctor Who logo no longer appears on the cover leaving only The New Adventures title. This re-branding was in the run up to the loss of the Doctor Who license and the continuation of the New Adventures as a standalone series.

External links
The Cloister Library - Eternity Weeps

1997 British novels
1997 science fiction novels
Virgin New Adventures
Novels by Jim Mortimore
Novels set on the Moon
Seventh Doctor novels
Fiction set in 2003